River Valley High School is a high school located in Mohave Valley, Arizona. The school is part of the Colorado River Union High School District. The school was established in 1992.
The current administration for River Valley High School 2022–2023 school year are as follows:
 Dorn Wilcox: Principal and Athletic Director 

The mascot for River Valley High School is a Dust Devil.

References

External links
 River Valley High School

Public high schools in Arizona
Educational institutions established in 1992
Schools in Mohave County, Arizona
1992 establishments in Arizona